WLJE (105.5 FM) is a radio station that has been broadcasting a country music format for over 35 years. Licensed to Valparaiso, Indiana, United States, it serves Northwest Indiana.  The station is currently owned by Adams Radio Group, LLC, through licensee Adams Radio of Northern Indiana, LLC, and features local programming along with the syndicated Nights with Elaina country music program via Westwood One.  The station also features national and local newscasts.  

The station began broadcasting on October 6, 1967, and originally held the call sign WAKE-FM, sister station to AM 1500 WAKE. Its call sign was changed to WLJE on May 1, 1971. The station was originally owned by Porter County Broadcasting Corporation. For most of the station's history it has aired a country music format. However, in the early 1970s, the station aired an easy listening format. Porter County Broadcasting Corporation's name was changed to Radio One Communications in 1993. In 2014, the station was sold to Adams Radio Group.

References

External links

LJE
Country radio stations in the United States
Radio stations established in 1967
1967 establishments in Indiana